Yaws (Yet another web server) is a web server written in Erlang by Claes (klacke) Wikström. Yaws can be embedded into other Erlang-based applications or run as a regular standalone web server.

Because Yaws uses Erlang's lightweight threading system, it performs well under high concurrency. A load test conducted in 2002 comparing Yaws and Apache found that with the hardware tested, Apache 2.0.39 with the worker MPM failed at 4,000 concurrent connections, while Yaws continued functioning with over 80,000 concurrent connections.

The load test concludes, "The problem with Apache is not related to the Apache code per se but is due to the manner in which the underlying operating system (Linux) implements concurrency. We believe that any system implemented using operating system threads and processes would exhibit similar performance. Erlang does not make use of the underlying OS's threads and processes for managing its own process pool and thus does not suffer from these limitations".and in the underlined part above (formatting added), expresses the opinion that the founding technologies make the difference in scalability.

See also

Comparison of web servers
LYME (software bundle)

References

External links

Interview with YAWS developer Claes Klacke Wikstrom (OGG or MP3)
ErlyWeb – MVC-pattern web framework for Yaws
Erlang Web – MVC-pattern web framework Yaws and Inets Erlang/OTP application
Nitrogen – An event-driven Web 2.0 framework for Erlang that runs on Yaws, Mochiweb, and Inets

Free web server software
Erlang (programming language)
Web server software for Linux